{{infobox person
| name               = Evelyn Tan
| image              = 
| alt                = 
| caption            = 
| birth_name         = Evelyn Tan Yuit Yin
| birth_date         = 
| occupation         = Singer, actress, presenter
| years_active       = 1997-present
| spouse             = Darren Lim
| children           = 3 sons and 1 daughter
| awards             =  Star Awards 1998 : Best Newcomer    Star Awards 1998 - Star Awards 1999 :  Top 10 Most Popular Female Artistes
| module             = 
| module2            = 
}}Evelyn Tan''' is a Singaporean actress and former singer. She was prominently a full-time Mediacorp artiste from 1997 to 2005.

Career
Tan joined Star Search Singapore in 1997 after university and was offered a contract by Television Corporation of Singapore (TCS) after making the top 20. The following year, she won the Most Popular Newcomer poll at the Star Awards 1998.

In 1998, Tan was signed by Hype Records, the third TCS artiste signed up by the company after Fann Wong and Zoe Tay.

In 1999, Tan and Dreamz FM, a local band, performed the song "Together" (心连心), the National Day theme song, at the 1999 Singapore National Day Parade.

In September 2000, Tan joined the newly formed SPH MediaWorks and diversified into hosting, presenting and newsreading. When it merged with MediaCorp in 2005, she was transferred to MediaWorks' parent company but subsequently resigned for family reasons.

Personal life
Tan studied at Chung Cheng High School (Yishun) and Temasek Junior College and graduated from the National University of Singapore with a degree in mathematics.

She married fellow actor Darren Lim on 27 March 2004. The couple have three sons and a daughter.

Filmography

Discography

Awards and nominations

References

1974 births
Living people
Singaporean television actresses
National University of Singapore alumni